Dorina is a feminine given name, related to Dora, which in Latin and Greek means "gift" or "gift of God".

People
Dorina Böczögő (born 1992), Hungarian gymnast
Dorina Emilia Carbune (born 1985), Romanian handball player
Dorina Catineanu (born 1954), Romanian retired long jumper
Dorina Frati, Italian mandolin player
Dorina Korsós (born 1995), Hungarian handball player
Dorina Mihai (born 1981), Romanian fencer
Dorina Mitrea (born 1965), Romanian-American mathematician
Dorina Neave (1880–1955), British writer
Dorina Szekeres (born 1992), Hungarian swimmer
Dorina Vaccaroni (born 1964), Italian fencer
Dorina Zele (born 1992), Hungarian basketball player

Fictional characters
Dorina Basarab, in a series of books by Karen Chance

See also

 Dorino (given name)
 

Given names
Feminine given names
Hungarian feminine given names
Romanian feminine given names